Chaetymenia is a genus of flowering plants in the daisy family.

There is only one known species, Chaetymenia peduncularis, endemic to Mexico.

References

Monotypic Asteraceae genera
Bahieae
Endemic flora of Mexico